The Tuzla-class New Type Patrol Boat (Turkish: Yeni Tip Karakol Botu) is one of the patrol boat classes of the Turkish Navy. The Tuzla class, named after a district in Istanbul with the same name, was designed by Dearsan Shipyards to meet the operational requirements of the Turkish Navy in littoral waters. These patrol boats conduct patrol, security and anti-submarine warfare (ASW) duties in or around harbors & coastal areas.

Development
The contract signed between SSM and Dearsan on 23 August 2007 called for 16 New Type Patrol Boats to be constructed until 2015. Along with Dearsan, 204 domestic supplier firms are involved with the NTPB project as well as several foreign ones such as MTU or Oto Melara. The project is a first for the Turkish Navy and the Turkish military shipbuilding industry as there is a 67.5% domestic production percentage compared with 65% for the MILGEM.

As of February 2015, all 16 boats have been delivered to the Turkish Navy.

Operators
 16 operated by the Turkish Navy.
 10 delivered and operational as of 2015 to the Turkmenistan Navy. First and currently only foreign operator of the Tuzla-class patrol boat.

Active ships

See also
List of major surface ships of the Turkish Navy

References

External links
Official Site

Patrol vessels of the Turkish Navy
Patrol boat classes